This is the list of Indian Cricket Team Performance in 2010

Team Performance in 2010 in Tests

Team Performance in 2010 in ODIs

Team Performance in 2010 T20s

India Overall Performance in 2010 

India in international cricket